Polygon (formerly Matic Network) is a blockchain platform that enables blockchain networks to connect and scale. It aims to create a multi-chain blockchain ecosystem compatible with Ethereum. As with Ethereum, it uses a proof-of-stake consensus mechanism for processing transactions on-chain.  Polygon's native token is named MATIC. Matic is an ERC-20 token, allowing for compatibility with other Ethereum based digital currencies. Over 7,000 blockchain projects are supported by the platform. 

Polygon is used in decentralized applications (dApps) such as Defi, DAOs, and NFTs.

History 
The Matic Network was launched in 2017 by four Mumbai-based software engineers: Jaynti Kanani, Sandeep Nailwa, Anurag Arjun, and Mihailo Bjelic.

In February 2021, the project rebranded into Polygon Technology, and began describing itself as a Web 3.0 and metaverse company. In December 2021, Polygon acquired the Mir blockchain network for 250 Million MATIC tokens (about $400M at the time of the deal). ZK-rollups were intended to offload data from Ethereum to reduce fees and speed-up the transaction process while maintaining security.

In February 2022, Polygon raised $450 million by selling MATIC tokens in a round led by Sequoia Capital India including reputed names in the industry like Tiger Global and Softbank Vision Fund.

On December 15, 2022, Donald Trump launched a series of digital art NFTs minted on the Polygon network for sale to the public for $US 99. each.

Technology 
Polygon uses a modified proof of stake consensus mechanism that enables a consensus to be achieved with every block. Achieving consensus using traditional proof of stake requires processing many blocks to achieve consensus. The proof of stake method requires network participants to stake—agree to not trade or sell—their MATIC tokens, in exchange for the right to validate Polygon network transactions. Successful validators in the Polygon network are rewarded with MATIC tokens.

The Polygon network aims to address problems within the Ethereum platform, namely high transaction fees and slow processing speeds.

Partnerships 

In July 2022, Polygon participated in Disney's 2022 acceleration program to expand into augmented reality, NFTs, and AI.

In October 2022, the Indian Police in Firozabad started using Polygon for reporting crimes.

In February 2023, Shemaroo Entertainment announced its partnership with Polygon to launch its NFT marketplace exclusively on Polygon's decentralized network.

References 

2017 software
Blockchains
Currencies introduced in 2017
Cryptocurrency projects